Aliaksandra Narkevich (Łacinka: Aliaksandra Siarhiejeŭna Narkievič; ; born 22 December 1994) is a Belarusian former rhythmic gymnast who competed mainly in group events. She is the 2012 Olympic group all-around silver medalist with group members Anastasiya Ivankova, Alina Tumilovich, Maryna Hancharova, Nataliya Leshchyk, and Kseniya Sankovich.

Career 

At the 2008 European Junior Championships, Narkevich won gold in the hoop final and the team silver medal. She competed as an individual gymnast at the 2011 World Championships but switched to competing with the Belarusian group in 2012.

Narkevich won the silver medal at the 2012 European Championships in group all-around. She then won a silver medal at the 2012 Summer Olympics in the group all-around event together with group members Anastasiya Ivankova, Alina Tumilovich, Nataliya Leshchyk, Maryna Hancharova, and Kseniya Sankovich.

At the 2013 World Championships in Kyiv, Narkevich won gold in group all-around and silver in 3 balls / 2 ribbons.

In 2014, Narkevich sustained a leg injury and sat out the whole season. She returned to the Belarusian group the following season. Narkevich was a member of the Belarusian group that won gold in 6 clubs / 2 hoops and bronze in the all-around at the inaugural European Games, in 2015. At the 2015 World Cup series in Kazan, Narkevich won the silver medal in group all-around, silver in 3 hoops / 6 clubs, and bronze in 5 ribbons. She announced her retirement at the end of the 2015 season.

Detailed Olympic results

References

External links
 
 
 

1994 births
Living people
Belarusian rhythmic gymnasts
Olympic gymnasts of Belarus
Olympic silver medalists for Belarus
Olympic medalists in gymnastics
Gymnasts at the 2012 Summer Olympics
Medalists at the 2012 Summer Olympics
European Games bronze medalists for Belarus
European Games medalists in gymnastics
Gymnasts at the 2015 European Games
Medalists at the Rhythmic Gymnastics World Championships
Gymnasts from Minsk